Marcello Fabbri (1923-2015) was an Italian writer and poet born in Florence, Italy, where he lived and wrote.

Fabbri graduated with a degree in jurisprudence. He fought in World War II and recorded much of his war experiences, which affected him deeply, in his work.

In 1970, Fabbri lost his sight in an auto accident. Much of his verse is dedicated to the transcendence of the experience.

In 1998, Fabbri was appointed President of the Florentine Chamber of Poets (Camerata dei Poeti) in the tradition of the Florentine Camerata. He was the successor of Otello Pagliai. He is an Academic of the MUSE. Giorgio Bàrberi Squarotti is among Fabbri's colleagues to reference his works.

With Florentine council members Anna Balsamo, Duccia Camiciotti and others, Fabbri organized literary salons and presentations to honor his contemporaries, poets such as Mario Luzi.

His published works range from poetry to prose of various genres and topics, including epic, lyric, and metaphysical philosophy.

Published works

Translations

References

External links
 Bibliography; Books by Marcello
 Fabbri Marcello Fabbri: uno scrittore nato dal buio by Giovanna Fozzer (Marcello Fabbri, a writer born from the dark)
 Author biography; About Marcello Fabbri, OlivePress
 Pressreader

Italian poets
Italian male poets
Blind writers
Writers from Brussels
1923 births
2015 deaths